Don't Fool with Me (German: Sing, aber spiel nicht mit mir) is a 1963 Austrian musical comedy film directed by Kurt Nachmann and starring Adrian Hoven, Wera Frydtberg and Paul Hörbiger.

It was shot at the Sievering Studios in Vienna using Eastmancolor. The film's sets were designed by the art director Wolf Witzemann.

Cast
 Adrian Hoven as Modeschöpfer, Maler und Lehrer Raul Thorsten
 Wera Frydtberg as Schwester Nina Thorsten
 Karin Heske as Schülerin Susi Berger
 Paul Hörbiger as Raimund Valentin
 Rex Gildo as Sänger Billie Bill
 Peter Vogel as Gag-Man Hans Rabe
 Hans Richter as Gag-Man Klaus Fuchs
 Lou Van Burg as Showmaster und Sänger Lou van Burg
 Carmela Corren as Juanita
 Brigitte Wentzel as Charlotte
 Oskar Sima as Direktor Sendelmohn
 Brigitte Franke as Sekretärin Fräulein Brigitte
 Erich Padalewski as Ferdi Zippel 
 Sissy Löwinger as Pipsi Parker 
 Kurt Nachmann as Cafetier Schebesta
 Audrey Arno as Sängerin Audrey Arno
 Hannelore Auer as Sängerin Hannelore Auer
 Das Jochen Brauer Sextett as Themselves - Musician
 Les Chakachas as Themselves - Musician
 Sacha Distel as Sänger Sacha Distel
 Angèle Durand as Sängerin Angèle Durand
 Sergio Franchi as Sänger Sergio Franchi
 Ted Herold as Sänger Ted Herold
 Trude Herr as Sängerin Trude Herr
 Peter Hinnen as Sänger Peter Hinnen
 Bill Ramsey as Sänger Bill Ramsey
 Willi Schmid as Sänger Willi Schmid
 Gerhard Wendland as Sänger Gerhard Wendland

References

Bibliography 
 Von Dassanowsky, Robert. Austrian Cinema: A History. McFarland, 2005.

External links 
 

1963 films
Austrian comedy films
1963 comedy films
1960s German-language films
Films shot at Sievering Studios
Films directed by Kurt Nachmann
Bavaria Film films